This page is about helicity in fluid dynamics.  For helicity of magnetic fields, see magnetic helicity. For helicity in particle physics, see helicity (particle physics).

In fluid dynamics, helicity is, under appropriate conditions, an invariant of the Euler equations of fluid flow, having a topological interpretation as a measure of linkage and/or knottedness of vortex lines in the flow. This was first proved by Jean-Jacques Moreau in 1961 and Moffatt derived it in 1969 without the knowledge of Moreau's paper. This helicity invariant is an extension of Woltjer's theorem for magnetic helicity.

Let  be the velocity field and  the corresponding vorticity field. Under the following three conditions, the vortex lines are transported with (or 'frozen in') the flow: (i) the fluid is inviscid; (ii) either the flow is incompressible, or it is compressible with a barotropic relation  between pressure  and density ; and (iii) any body forces acting on the fluid are conservative.

Let  be the volume inside such a surface.

Helicity is a pseudo-scalar quantity: it changes sign under change from a right-handed to a left-handed frame of reference; it can be considered as a measure of the handedness (or chirality) of the flow. Helicity is one of the four known integral invariants of the Euler equations; the other three are energy, momentum and angular momentum.

The invariance of helicity provides an essential cornerstone of the subject topological fluid dynamics and magnetohydrodynamics, which is concerned with global properties of flows and their topological characteristics.

Meteorology
In meteorology, helicity corresponds to the transfer of vorticity from the environment to an air parcel in convective motion. Here the definition of helicity is simplified to only use the horizontal component of wind and vorticity:

H is then positive if the wind veers (turns clockwise) with altitude and negative if it backs (turns counterclockwise). This helicity used in meteorology has energy units per units of mass and thus is interpreted as a measure of energy transfer by the wind shear with altitude, including directional.

This notion is used to predict the possibility of tornadic development in a thundercloud. In this case, the vertical integration will be limited below cloud tops (generally 3 km or 10,000 feet) and the horizontal wind will be calculated to wind relative to the storm in subtracting its motion:

Critical values of SRH (Storm Relative Helicity) for tornadic development, as researched in North America, are:

 SRH = 150-299 ... supercells possible with weak tornadoes according to Fujita scale
 SRH = 300-499 ... very favourable to supercells development and strong tornadoes
 SRH > 450 ... violent tornadoes
 When calculated only below 1 km (4,000 feet), the cut-off value is 100.

Helicity in itself is not the only component of severe thunderstorms, and these values are to be taken with caution. That is why the Energy Helicity Index (EHI) has been created. It is the result of SRH multiplied by the CAPE (Convective Available Potential Energy) and then divided by a threshold CAPE: EHI = (CAPE x SRH) / 160,000. This incorporates not only the helicity but the energy of the air parcel and thus tries to eliminate weak potential for thunderstorms even in strong SRH regions. The critical values of EHI:

 EHI = 1 ... possible tornadoes
 EHI = 1-2 ... moderate to strong tornadoes
 EHI > 2 ... strong tornadoes

Notes

References

 Batchelor, G.K., (1967, reprinted 2000) An Introduction to Fluid Dynamics, Cambridge Univ. Press
 Ohkitani, K., "Elementary Account Of Vorticity And Related Equations". Cambridge University Press. January 30, 2005. 
 Chorin, A.J., "Vorticity and Turbulence". Applied Mathematical Sciences, Vol 103, Springer-Verlag. March 1, 1994. 
 Majda, A.J. & Bertozzi, A.L., "Vorticity and Incompressible Flow". Cambridge University Press; 1st edition. December 15, 2001. 
 Tritton, D.J., "Physical Fluid Dynamics". Van Nostrand Reinhold, New York. 1977. 
 Arfken, G., "Mathematical Methods for Physicists", 3rd ed. Academic Press, Orlando, FL. 1985. 
Moffatt, H.K. (1969) The degree of knottedness of tangled vortex lines. J. Fluid Mech. 35, pp. 117–129.
Moffatt, H.K. & Ricca, R.L. (1992) Helicity and the Cǎlugǎreanu Invariant. Proc. R. Soc. Lond. A 439, pp. 411–429.
Thomson, W. (Lord Kelvin) (1868) On vortex motion. Trans. Roy. Soc. Edin. 25, pp. 217–260.

Fluid dynamics